This is a list of dinosaurs whose remains have been recovered from India or Madagascar. Though widely separated today, the Indian subcontinent and Madagascar were connected throughout much of the Mesozoic and shared similar dinosaur faunas, distinct from what has been found on other modern African and Asian landmasses.

The Indian fossil record of dinosaurs is good, with fossils coming from the entire Mesozoic era – starting with the Triassic period (a geological period that started 251.9 million years ago and continued till 201.3 million years ago), to the Jurassic period (201 million years ago to 145 million years ago) and Cretaceous period (from 145 million years ago to 66 million years ago), when globally all non-avian dinosaurs and 65 per cent of all life became extinct. Madagascar also preserves various unique dinosaurs from the Jurassic and Cretaceous.

Criteria for inclusion
The genus must appear on the List of dinosaur genera.
At least one named species of the creature must have been found in India or Madagascar.
This list is a complement to :Category:Dinosaurs of India and Madagascar.

List of Indian and Madagascan dinosaurs

Valid genera

Invalid and potentially valid genera

 Dravidosaurus blanfordi: Described as a stegosaur but has been suggested to be a plesiosaur. However, it has been reported that stegosaur remains from its time and place are being described.
 Rahonavis ostromi: A small feathered maniraptoran. It has been variously suggested to be a dromaeosaurid (possibly an unenlagiine), an avialan, or outside both groups.

Timeline
This is a timeline of selected dinosaurs from the list above.  Time is measured in Ma, megaannum, along the x-axis.

See also

 List of birds of India
 List of birds of Madagascar

References

India and Madagascar
Dinosaurs
Dinosaurs
†Dinosaurs
Articles which contain graphical timelines